The Oder is a  river in Lower Saxony, Germany, and a right tributary of the Rhume. Its source is in the Harz mountains, near Sankt Andreasberg. It flows southwest through Bad Lauterberg, Pöhlde and Hattorf am Harz. The Oder flows into the Rhume in Katlenburg-Lindau.

Course 
The Oder rises in the district of Goslar in the heart of the Harz Mountains. The river's source is called the Odersprung or "Oder Leap."

On the Brockenfeld, which is close to the Odersprung, the rivers Abbe, Große Bode, Ecker and Kalte Bode also have their respective origins. On its perimeter is the ancient Dreieckiger Pfahl boundary stone.

A few kilometres further downstream, the river is impounded for the second time not far southwest of Oder Valley Sawmill (Odertaler Sägemühle) by the barrage of the Oder Dam. Thereafter the river flows through Bad Lauterberg and leaves the Harz.

In Bad Lauterberg the Oder swings west, running through Pöhlde and Hattorf am Harz, passing north of the Rotenberg ridge, and reaches Wulften. In Hattorf it collects the Sieber river coming from the northeast, before emptying into the Rhume (a tributary of the Leine) in Katlenburg from the east.

Between Scharzfeld and Katlenburg the Oder flows through the nature reserve of Oderaue.

Villages where the river flows 
  (district of Sankt Andreasberg)
  (district of Sankt Andreasberg)
 Bad Lauterberg
 Scharzfeld
 Pöhlde
 Hattorf am Harz
 Wulften am Harz
 Katlenburg-Lindau

Tributaries 
 Sperrlutter
 Lutter
 Sieber

Pictures

See also
List of rivers of Lower Saxony

References

 
Rivers of Lower Saxony
Rivers of the Harz
Rivers of Germany